Reelmonk is a Kochi-based online film distribution platform offering primarily Malayalam films aimed at the non-residential Indian audience. Launched in July 2015, it was created by Vivek Paul, Gautham Vyas, and Blaise Crowly of Xincoz Labs. Reelmonk is intended as a legal alternative to piracy. The site is no longer functional.

Releases
Ottaal, directed by Jayaraj, was released online through Reelmonk on the same day it opened on theaters, making it the first film in India to release simultaneously in theatres and online.

References

External links

Online retailers of India
Video on demand services
Indian companies established in 2015